Casino Moose Jaw is located in downtown Moose Jaw, Saskatchewan, Canada, and is owned and operated by Sask Gaming. The government of Saskatchewan announced the construction of the $13 million facility on July 26, 2001. It was opened on September 6, 2002.

The casino has an Art Deco look inspired by the Roaring Twenties, a period of historic significance for the city. In addition to the gaming floor, the casino is connected to the Temple Gardens Hotel & Spa.

See also
 List of casinos in Canada

References

External links 

Buildings and structures in Moose Jaw
Casinos in Saskatchewan
Music venues in Saskatchewan
2002 establishments in Saskatchewan
Casinos completed in 2002